Duba may refer to:

Duba, Saudi Arabia, a town in Saudi Arabia
Duba, Warmian-Masurian Voivodeship, a village in Poland
Duba River, a headwater of the Căian River in Romania
Duba, Slivno, a hamlet in the municipality of Slivno, Dubrovnik-Neretva County, Croatia
Duba Pelješka, a village in the municipality of Trpanj, Dubrovnik-Neretva County, Croatia
Duba Stonska, a village in the municipality of Ston, Dubrovnik-Neretva County, Croatia
Duba, an alternative name for the Nandi bear
Dubá, a town in the Czech Republic
Steevan Dos Santos, a professional footballer also known as "Duba"
Duba (surname)
Ali Duba, Syrian general
Garba Duba, Nigerian politician
Karel Duba, Czech musician
Tomáš Duba, Czech ice hockey player